LIRG may refer to:

 Luminous infrared galaxy
 Guidonia Air Force Base, by ICAO code

See also
 LRG (disambiguation)